Rita Limao Oliveira (born 25 August 1991) is a Portuguese artistic gymnast, representing her nation at international competitions.

She competed at  the 2007 World Artistic Gymnastics Championships in Stuttgart, Germany.

She was a member of Ginasio Clube Portugues Lissabon.

References

External links 
 Rita Limão Oliveira - FX - Dia Olimpico 2007 - YouTube, Sept. 3, 2007

Portuguese artistic gymnasts
Living people

1991 births